Bjarni Guðmundsson (born 5 January 1957) is an Icelandic former handball player who competed in the 1984 Summer Olympics.

References

1957 births
Living people
Bjarni Gudmundsson
Bjarni Gudmundsson
Handball players at the 1984 Summer Olympics